Killian Le Roy (born 31 January 1998) is a French professional footballer who plays as a goalkeeper for Luxembourgish club Racing-Union.

Career

Chambly 
On 7 November 2020, Le Roy made his professional debut for Chambly, coming on as a substitute after the expulsion of Simon Pontdemé in a 2–2 Ligue 2 draw against Troyes. His first start came on 13 February 2021, when he played the full ninety minutes of 1–0 loss to Clermont.

Châteauroux 
On 8 July 2021, Le Roy signed for Championnat National club Châteauroux on a two-year contract. On 31 August 2022, his contract with Châteauroux was terminated by mutual consent.

References

External links 
 
 
 

1998 births
Sportspeople from Côtes-d'Armor
Footballers from Brittany
Living people
French footballers
Association football goalkeepers
En Avant Guingamp players
AS Saint-Étienne players
FC Chambly Oise players
LB Châteauroux players
Racing FC Union Luxembourg players
Championnat National 3 players
Championnat National 2 players
Ligue 2 players
French expatriate footballers
Expatriate footballers in Luxembourg
French expatriate sportspeople in Luxembourg